Anthony Andrew Rees (born 1 August 1964) is a Welsh former professional footballer who played as a forward. As a youth he was part of the Aston Villa team which won the 1980 FA Youth Cup. He left Aston Villa without appearing for the first team, but went on to play nearly 300 games in the Football League, for Birmingham City, Peterborough United, Shrewsbury Town, Barnsley, Grimsby Town and West Bromwich Albion, appeared in all four divisions, and won one full cap for Wales.

Honours
 with Aston Villa
 FA Youth Cup winner 1980
 with Grimsby Town
 Football League Fourth Division promotion 1990
 Football League Third Division promotion 1991

References

Living people
1964 births
Footballers from Merthyr Tydfil
Welsh footballers
Association football forwards
Wales international footballers
Wales under-21 international footballers
Aston Villa F.C. players
Birmingham City F.C. players
Peterborough United F.C. players
Shrewsbury Town F.C. players
Barnsley F.C. players
Grimsby Town F.C. players
West Bromwich Albion F.C. players
Merthyr Tydfil F.C. players
English Football League players